Events in the year 1938 in Turkey.

Parliament
 5th Parliament of Turkey

Incumbents
President 
 Kemal Atatürk (up to 10 November)
İsmet İnönü (from 10 November)
Prime Minister – Celal Bayar

Ruling party and the main opposition
 Ruling party – Republican People's Party (CHP)

Cabinet
9th government of Turkey (up to 11 November)
10th government of Turkey (from 11 November)

Events
31 March – First public statement about Atatürks's health
14 April – Konak Terminal a busy ferry terminal in İzmir was opened
19 April – 1938 Kırşehir earthquake
20 May – Atatürk's last national tour (to Mersin) He stressed on the Hatay republic problem
5 July – Turkish army in Hatay (by treaty)
2 September – The Hatay Republic was founded, Tayfur Sökmen was elected as the Hatay president
28 October – Ankara Radio began broadcasting
10 November – Atatürk died
11 November – 
İsmet İnönü was elected as the new president 
New government   
31 December – By elections

Births
 1 January – Birol Pekel, footballer
1 January – Halit Akçatepe, actor
27 March – Kartal Tibet, actor
28 March – Genco Erkal, theatre actor
31 March – Ahmet Ayık, wrestler
17 May – Emine Işınsu, writer (died 2021)
12 June – Erol Sabancı, industrialist
1 July – Yalçın Küçük, writer, historian
20 July – Deniz Baykal, politician
1 October – Tunç Başaran, film director
10 November – Ogün Altıparmak, footballer
31 December – Berkant Akgürgen, singer

Deaths
30 January -Mehmed Ziyaeddin (born in 1873), Ottoman dynasty member
13 March - Cevat Çobanlı (born in 1870), retired general
23 September - Kâzım İnanç (born in 1881), soldier, politician

Gallery

References

 
Years of the 20th century in Turkey
Turkey
Turkey
Turkey